Priya Sigdel (born December 8, 1995) is a Nepali beauty pageant contestant who won the title of 'Miss Nepal Earth 2018', and a social activist.

Biography
Priya Sigdel was born in Kathmandu, Nepal, to an intercaste family. 
She is co-founder and president of Hatti Hatti Nepal. She is also the national coordinator of Bangladesh Nepal Youth Convention. She is a member of the 2017 Global Changemakers cohort and a 2016 Global Young Peace Ambassador.

She is a Development Studies graduate from the National College, Baluwatar, and is a country coordinator for UDAAN Foundation. She represented Nepal at Miss Earth 2018 where she placed in the Top 18.
She also participated in Miss Universe Nepal 2020 and placed in the top 10.

References

Miss Nepal winners
Nepalese female models
Nepalese beauty pageant winners
Miss Earth 2018 contestants
1995 births
Living people